Shaolin Drunkard (Orig. Tian shi zhuang xie, a.k.a. Wu Tang Master, a.k.a. Miracle Fighters 2) is a 1983 kung fu comedy film directed by Yuen Woo-ping, written by Yuen Woo-ping and Chung Hing Chiu, and starring Yuen Cheung-yan, Eddy Ko, and Yuen Shun-yi.

Plot
At a Shaolin temple, an evil magician demon is being held prisoner. A drunken shaolin sorcerer, Chan, shirks his duty to go drinking, leading to the demon escaping. At the same time, Ah Yuen, another sorcerer, is being hassled by his grandmother Yau to find a wife. He sets out to find his potential bride, and battles another magician who's using his powers to con local townsfolk. After winning, he finds out there's a competition to wed the bride of a local magistrate. He wins the competition, but it turns out the magistrate is actually being threatened by the evil magician to find lunar-born virgins so he can drink their blood and gain their powers. After avoiding a death-trap to steal his blood and fleeing, he eventually crosses paths with Chan, who recruits him to help re-capture the evil magician.

References

External links

1983 films
1980s Cantonese-language films
Hong Kong martial arts comedy films
1983 martial arts films
1983 comedy films
Films directed by Yuen Woo-ping
Vampire comedy films
Kung fu films
1980s Hong Kong films